Justo Garcia was an American soccer player who earned one cap with the U.S. national team in a 10-0 loss to England on May 27, 1964.  In 1964, he played with New York Hota of the German American Soccer League.  He then played for the Hota in the Eastern Professional Soccer League during the 1964-1965 season.

References

American soccer players
United States men's international soccer players
German-American Soccer League players
Eastern Professional Soccer League (1928–29) players
New York Hota players
Living people
Association footballers not categorized by position
Year of birth missing (living people)